Arecio Colmán (born 10 June 1951) is a Paraguayan footballer. He played in 13 matches for the Paraguay national football team from 1971 to 1979. He was also part of Paraguay's squad for the 1979 Copa América tournament.

References

1951 births
Living people
Paraguayan footballers
Paraguay international footballers
Place of birth missing (living people)
Association football midfielders